James Carlton Anderson better known by his stage name Yung Wun is an American rapper from Atlanta.

Biography 
Yung Wun was raised in Eastlake Meadows housing projects, otherwise known as "Little Vietnam". Yung Wun was very quickly exposed to the effects of crime and soon became involved with several gangs. By the age of thirteen, he had fully embraced a life of criminality. Yung Wun had numerous encounters with police as he took part in random lawlessness, which landed him in the throes of the juvenile justice system.

It was during the height of this pandemonium Yung Wun found relief from this madness through lyrical expression. He began rhyming as a form of escape. He even won several oratorical contests and writing awards. Yung Wun's grandmother, Vera, regularly pleaded with him to turn around his life. She would continually plead with her grandson to get off the streets and concentrate on his talents of speaking and writing. In the single most pivotal moment of his young life, Yung Wun's grandmother died in his arms. Overwhelmed by her death, he was left to contemplate his future path. Remembering what his grandmother told him, he decided to clean his life up and choose a more legal path. Yung Wun devoted his life to his art form.

Career 
Inspired by the works of his rap idols notably Tupac Shakur, The Notorious B.I.G. and DMX, he began showcasing his talents all over metro Atlanta, grabbing the attention of several music executives. Yung Wun appeared on several underground down south projects while he endured the underhandedness of the music industry.

In 1998, his career took an upward turn when he signed with producers from Dark Society Recordings, an Atlanta-based production company.  The team completed an album project and presented it to platinum selling super producer, Swizz Beatz.  Swizz Beatz was impressed with Yung Wun's ability and offered Dark Society Recordings a production deal on his label Full Surface / J Records.  Yung Wun has been featured on several platinum selling rap albums.  He was featured on the "Down Bottom" remix with Drag-On from the multi platinum selling Ruff Ryder compilation Volume!  He also teamed up with Drag-On again for the remix of "Trouble" of his 2004 album Hell and Back.  He rapped alongside Snoop Dogg, Jadakiss and Scarface on "World War III" from Ruff Ryder's second compilation and he was also at Ryde or die Boyz at the chorus.  He was also featured on Jadakiss' first solo album and appeared on Swizz Beatz compilation on DreamWorks, G.H.E.T.T.O. Stories.

Yung Wun's lyrical style consists of a blend of down south energy and ferocious.  His first solo album The Dirtiest Thirstiest was released in 2004 on J Records co-signed under Arnold Schwarzenegger.  He also created "Yung Wun Anthem", which was included on the soundtrack for EA Sport's "Madden NFL 2005" video game.

Discography

Albums

Singles

Promotional singles

References 

1982 births
Living people
African-American male rappers
Rappers from Atlanta
Ruff Ryders artists
Southern hip hop musicians
Hardcore hip hop artists
21st-century American rappers
21st-century American male musicians
21st-century African-American musicians
20th-century African-American people